Kefalogiannis is a Greek surname with the female form being Kefalogianni. Notable people with this surname include:

 Aristidis Kefalogiannis (born 1960), Greek water polo player
 Ioannis Kefalogiannis (1933–2012), Greek politician and government minister
 Ioannis A. Kefalogiannis (born 1982), Greek politician
 Manolis Kefalogiannis (born 1959), Greek politician and government minister
 Olga Kefalogianni (born 1975), Greek politician and government minister

Greek-language surnames
Surnames